"The Living Dead" is the seventh episode of the fifth series of the 1960s cult British spy-fi television series The Avengers, starring Patrick Macnee and Diana Rigg, and guest starring Julian Glover, Pamela Ann Davy, Howard Marion-Crawford, and Jack Woolgar. It was first broadcast in the Southern and Tyne Tees regions of the ITV network on Wednesday 22 February 1967. ABC Weekend Television, who commissioned the show for ITV, broadcast it in its own regions three days later on Saturday 25 February. The episode was directed by John Krish, and written by Brian Clemens.

Plot
When the ghost of the deceased Duke of Benedict turns up in the cemetary, Steed and Emma have to check out the mining disaster that apparently killed the duke.

Cast
Patrick Macnee as John Steed
Diana Rigg as Emma Peel
Julian Glover as Masgard
Pamela Ann Davy as Mandy
Howard Marion Crawford as Geoffrey
Jack Woolgar as Kermit
Jack Watson as Hopper
Edward Underdown as Rupert
John Cater as Olliphant
Vernon Dobtcheff as Spencer
Alister Williamson as Tom

References

External links

Episode overview on The Avengers Forever! website

The Avengers (season 5) episodes